Draupadi Ghimiray is an Indian social activist. She was honoured with the Padma Shri, India's fourth highest civilian award in 2019.

Notable Work
Ghimaray founded Sikkim Viklang Sahayata Samiti (SVSS) for the benefit of the disabled people of Sikkim.

References

Indian activists
Sikkim
Indian women
Year of birth missing (living people)
Living people
Recipients of the Padma Shri in social work